The Southern Star is the newspaper of Ozark, Alabama and one of the oldest newspapers in the Wiregrass region. It is a weekly publication and new editions are delivered every Thursday.

The newspaper was founded in 1867 by Joseph A. Adams, a former Confederate soldier with no journalism experience, and was still owned by his descendants until November 2021 at which time it was sold to Maine publisher, Mr. Pierre Little.

The newspaper can be located online at www.ozarkal.news

References

External links
The Southern Star

Newspapers published in Alabama
Dale County, Alabama
Publications established in 1867